Thomas D. Luth (born 1954) is an American comic book artist best known for his work as the colorist for the Sergio Aragonés comic series, Groo the Wanderer. Luth's work has also appeared in a number of other comics and national periodicals, such as MAD magazine and Flare.

References
Colorist of Groo the Wanderer
Official Groo Bio
Speculation about Luth coloring procedures prior to computer technology

1954 births
Comics colorists
Living people
Place of birth missing (living people)